Isidore Goldstein (June 6, 1908 – September 24, 1993) was an American baseball player.  A native of Odessa who grew up in The Bronx, he was a right-handed pitcher who played seven years in professional baseball from 1928 to 1934, including 16 games in Major League Baseball with the 1932 Detroit Tigers. He compiled a 3–2 record and 4.47 in his 16 major league games.

Early years
Goldstein, who was born in 1908 in Odessa, Russian Empire (now part of Ukraine), was Jewish, and moved with his family to the Bronx in New York City as a boy. He dropped out of high school to join a local semipro baseball team. When his semipro baseball career did not work out, Goldstein re-enrolled in high school, at James Monroe High School in The Bronx.  He was teammates with future Baseball Hall of Fame slugger Hank Greenberg on the James Monroe baseball team. The team lost 4–1 at the Polo Grounds in the city championship game.

Goldstein again returned to semipro baseball, this time with a team from Long Island, as a right-handed,  pitcher.

Professional career

Minors
The Tigers signed Goldstein and assigned him to the Wheeling Stogies of the Mid-Atlantic League where he compiled a 12–9 record and a 3.61 ERA in 1928. In 1929, Goldstein played for the Evansville Hubs of the Three I League, compiling a 12–8 record with a 2.74 ERA. Goldstein remained in Evansville in 1930, compiling a 14–11 record and a 3.52 ERA.

Goldstein spent most of the 1931 season with the Beaumont Exporters of the Texas League.  In Beaumont, Goldstein was reunited with his high school teammate Hank Greenberg. Goldstein compiled a 16–11 record and 3.58 ERA at Beaumont in 1931.

Detroit Tigers
In 1932, the Tigers invited Goldstein to spring training but sent him back to Beaumont to start the season. Goldstein compiled a 6–1 record and 1.58 ERA at the start of the 1932 season with Beaumont. He was promoted to the Tigers and made his major league debut at Navin Field on April 24, 1932. In May 1932, Goldstein got his first major league win. On June 27, 1932, Goldstein pitched a complete game and allowed five hits, defeating the White Sox 9 to 3, though he also walked five batters and hit two batters. The victory over the White Sox was Goldstein's last game in the majors. In 16 games, including six starts, Goldstein compiled a 3–2 record with a 4.47 ERA and a 1.846 WHIP rating. He also compiled a .294 batting average (5 for 17) showed considerable talent, Izzy's skills were not fully harnessed during his short stay in the majors.

Return to minors
Goldstein finished the 1932 season with the Class AA Toronto Maple Leafs of the International League.  He sustained a major arm injury late in the 1932 season.  He returned from the injury in 1933 and compiled a 9–7 record with a 4.17 ERA in 1933.

Personal life

Goldstein retired from baseball after the 1938 season and began selling men's clothing in New York City. In 1943, Goldstein was drafted and served in the South Pacific theater from 1943 to 1945. After the war, Goldstein returned to his career selling men's clothing until 1975, when he moved to Florida. He died in 1993 at Delray Beach, Florida, at the age of 85. He was buried at the Jewish Eternal Light Memorial Gardens in Boynton Beach, Florida.

References

External links

The Jewish Baseball Hall of Fame: A Who's who of Baseball Stars, by Erwin Lynn, Shapolsky Publishers (1986). 

1908 births
1993 deaths
American people of Ukrainian-Jewish descent
Detroit Tigers players
Jewish American baseball players
Jewish Major League Baseball players
Major League Baseball pitchers
Major League Baseball players from Ukraine
Sportspeople from Odesa
Jews from the Russian Empire
Ukrainian Jews
James Monroe High School (New York City) alumni
20th-century American Jews
Emigrants from the Russian Empire to the United States